Thomas FitzMaurice, Lord OConnello, (c. 1145 – 1213) of Shanid,  was the eldest son of Maurice FitzGerald, Lord of Lanstephan by his wife, Alice (daughter of Arnulf de Montgomery).  Thomas was the progenitor of the Geraldine House of Desmond, and brother of Gerald FitzMaurice, 1st Lord of Offaly, progenitor of the Geraldine Houses of Kildare and Leinster.

In 1210, Thomas invaded Connacht with Geoffrey de Marisco at the head of a force of Anglo-Norman troops gathered in Munster, and of followers of Donnchad Cairprech Ó Briain, King of Thomond. This expedition aided in forcing Cathal Crobhdearg Ua Conchobair, King of Connacht into negotiations with John de Gray, Justiciar of Ireland.

Marriage and issue
Thomas FitzMaurice married Ellinor, daughter of Jordan de Marisco, and sister of Geoffrey de Marisco, who was appointed justiciar of Ireland in 1215., and had issue:

 John FitzGerald, 1st Baron Desmond

Notes

1140s births
1213 deaths
Normans in Ireland
Norman warriors
FitzGerald dynasty
12th-century Irish people
13th-century Irish people